Maria Helena Rosas Fernandes (born 1933) is a Brazilian composer, pianist, musicologist, conductor and music educator.

Fernandes was born in Brazópolis in Minas Gerais state, and graduated in piano from the Brazilian Conservatory of Music of Guanabara State in piano and from the Superior School of Music Santa Marcelina in composition and conducting.

After completing her studies, Fernandes worked as a choral conductor and music teacher at conservatories and published research on indigenous Brazilian music. Her works have been performed internationally and won awards including the 2006 Nancy Van de Vate International Composition Prize for Opera for Marília de Dirceu.

Works
Selected works include:
Prelúdio
Valsa
Cantilena
Canto de Maricatu
''Marília de Dirceu, opera

Her compositions have been recorded and issued on CD, including:
Brasileira: Piano Music by Brazilian Women (2003) Centaur Records

References

1933 births
Living people
20th-century classical composers
Brazilian music educators
Women classical composers
Brazilian classical composers
Brazilian opera composers
Women opera composers
20th-century Brazilian musicians
Women music educators
20th-century women composers